God morgon may refer to:
Good morning, a greeting in Swedish
"God morgon" (Chips song), 1981
"God morgon" (Uno & Irma song), 2007